Vasily Dorofeev (born 6 August 1990) is a Russian rugby union player who generally plays as a fullback represents Russia internationally.

He was included in the Russian squad for the 2019 Rugby World Cup which is scheduled to be held in Japan for the first time and also marks his first World Cup appearance.

Career 
He made his international debut for Russia against Hong Kong on 8 November 2014.

References 

Russian rugby union players
Russia international rugby union players
Living people
1990 births
Sportspeople from Krasnoyarsk
Rugby union fullbacks